Mars Orbiter Mission 2 (MOM 2), also called Mangalyaan-2 ("Mars-craft", from  mangal, "Mars" and यान yān, "craft, vehicle"), is India's second interplanetary mission planned by the Indian Space Research Organisation (ISRO). In a recorded interview in October 2019, Vikram Sarabhai Space Centre (VSSC) director indicated possibility of inclusion of a lander but in an interview to The Times Of India in February 2021 ISRO chairman clarified that the mission will consist of only an orbiter. The orbiter will use aerobraking to lower its initial apoapsis and enter into an orbit more suitable for observations. 

The Indian Space Research Organization plans to launch this mission by 2025. The mission will include a hyperspectral camera, a high resolution panchromatic camera and a radar to understand early Martian crust, recent basalts and boulder falls. The mission is proposed to be followed by another, including soft landing on Mars in 2030.

History
Following the successful insertion of the Mars Orbiter Mission (also called Mangalyaan) into Martian orbit, ISRO announced its intent to launch a second mission to Mars at the Engineers Conclave conference held in Bengaluru on 28 October 2014. The proposed launch vehicle for this campaign is the GSLV Mk III, which flew for the first time on 5 June 2017, which might be powerful enough to place MOM on a direct-to-Mars trajectory alongside carrying much more heavier satellite, unlike the lighter Mars Orbiter Mission, which used a less powerful PSLV rocket.

In January 2016, India and France signed a letter of intent for ISRO and CNES to jointly build MOM 2 by 2020, but by April 2018, France was not yet involved in the mission. The Indian government funded MOM 2 in its 2017 budget proposal, and ISRO is considering whether the best path is to conduct an orbiter/lander/rover mission or to opt for only an orbiter with more sophisticated instruments than those flown on MOM. In a podcast recording VSSC director S. Somanath in October 2019, it was reported the architecture for mission is yet to be finalized and may also have a lander and rover, but no timeline was announced.

In February 2021, ISRO called for 'Announcement of Opportunities' on MOM 2. In it, K. Sivan announced that Mangalyaan 2 will only be an orbiter mission.

Development

An Announcement of Opportunity was released requesting submissions for scientific instruments for an orbiter only, with a deadline set for 20 September 2016.

One of the science payloads under development is an ionosphere plasma instrument named ARIS. It is being developed by Space Satellite Systems and Payloads Centre (SSPACE), which is part of the Indian Institute of Space Science and Technology (IIST).  The engineering model and high vacuum test have been completed.

In a panel discussion in September 2022, it was told that mission would include a hyperspectral camera, a very high resolution panchromatic camera and a radar to better understand the early stages of Mars, its early crust, recent basalts, and ongoing activities such as boulder falls.

Future missions
The MOM-2 has been proposed to be followed by MOM-3 which would include soft landing of a rover on Mars, possibly at Eridania basin.

See also

 List of missions to Mars
 Exploration of Mars

References

ISRO space probes
Indian Space Research Organisation
Missions to Mars
Proposed space probes
2024 in spaceflight
2024 in India